Reese's Pieces are a peanut butter candy manufactured by The Hershey Company; they are oblate spheroid in shape and covered in candy shells that are colored yellow, orange, or brown. They can be purchased in plastic packets, cardboard boxes, or cup-shaped travel containers. The Reese company was founded by H.B. Reese. The H.B. Reese Candy Company was merged with The Hershey Company in 1963.

Overview
The candy was introduced to the US market first in September 1978. Shortly after, Reese's Pieces were introduced to the Canada market in 1980. 
The then relatively new product became very popular with the 1982 release of E.T. the Extra-Terrestrial, in which the candy is featured.

Reese's Pieces were introduced in the UK in 1996, but are produced in the US.

Reese's Pieces are a product extension of the Reese's Peanut Butter Cups line; they were designed to capitalize on the success of the chocolate-covered peanut butter cups, though unlike the cups, they have no chocolate.

Variations
Reese's Pieces has been included in many Reese's and Hershey's products since its introduction. Below is a list of available products that contain Reese's Pieces, from the candy pieces being stuffed inside of existing chocolate bar variations to bags of baking chip mixes.

Production

In the 1970s, the candies were produced by The Hershey Company using panning machines that had been used to make Hershey-ets, a chocolate-filled candy that had been discontinued. The candy was first called "PBs" and was later rechristened as Reese's Pieces. Designers wanted a peanut-flavored candy but had problems with the filling. Original plans called for filling the candy shells with peanut butter, but the oil leaked out into the shell, leaving it soft, rather than crunchy.

The developer of the project turned the problem over to a team of outside scientists, who created a peanut-flavored penuche filling. More experimentation was needed to determine the correct thickness of the shell. Finally, the colors of the candy coating were designed to coordinate with the color of the Reese's package. The color distribution goal is 50% orange, 25% brown, and 25% yellow.

E.T. the Extra-Terrestrial
In 1982, the Mars candy bar company rejected a product placement offer for the inclusion of its key product M&M's in the Steven Spielberg film, E.T. the Extra-Terrestrial. Hershey accepted an offer for use of Reese's Pieces in the movie, and with the film's blockbuster success its product sales dramatically increased, perhaps as much as 300%.

Product line expansion
In 2010, The Hershey Company expanded the Pieces line to include York Peppermint Pattie Pieces, Hershey's Special Dark Pieces, and Almond Joy Pieces.  Hershey's Milk Chocolate with Almonds Pieces became the fourth expansion of this line in 2012.

See also
 Galaxy Minstrels
 M&M's
 Smarties—chocolate candies that are not sold in the U.S.

References

External links

 Official product page

 

Products introduced in 1978
Candy
Peanut butter confectionery
The Hershey Company brands
Kosher food
E.T. the Extra-Terrestrial
1980s in food
Brand name confectionery